Robert William Marshall  (30 October 1864 – 5 January 1924) was a Scottish professional footballer, best known for his time with Rangers.

Career
A right half, Marshall played for several clubs around Glasgow, starting at St Andrews, then Partick until they folded in the mid-1880s, and Partick Thistle. He joined Rangers in the summer of 1889, and was a key figure in the early years of the Scottish Football League. He won the shared 1890–91 championship, as well as the Scottish Cup in 1894. He made 124 appearances with Rangers in the two major competitions and scored five goals. In 1896 he moved to Abercorn.

Marshall won two Scotland caps in 1892 and 1894, captaining the side in the latter fixture, against Ireland.  He also represented the Scottish League XI once in 1895.

See also
List of Scotland national football team captains

References

External links

1864 births
1924 deaths 
Rangers F.C. players
Partick Thistle F.C. players
Scotland international footballers
Scottish footballers
Scottish Football League players
Association football wing halves
Scottish Football League representative players
Abercorn F.C. players
Footballers from Glasgow
Partick F.C. players